Labdia dicyanitis is a moth in the family Cosmopterigidae. It was described by Edward Meyrick in 1934. It is known from Rapa Iti.

References

Labdia
Moths described in 1934